This is a list of Members of the Northern Ireland Constitutional Convention, which was elected in 1975.

All members elected to the Northern Ireland Constitutional Convention are listed. Members are grouped by party.

Members by party
This is a list of members elected to the Northern Ireland Constitutional Convention, sorted by party.

Members by constituency
The list is given in alphabetical order by constituency.

References
Northern Ireland Elections: Northern Ireland Constitutional Convention Elections 1975

 
Northern Ireland, Constitutional Convention